Independent Socialists may refer to:

Independent Socialists (France)
Independent Socialists (Latvia)
Independent Socialists (Spain)
International Socialists (United States), a group formed out of the Independent Socialist Clubs of America
Independent Socialists (Venezuela)
Independent Socialists of Extremadura

See also
Independent-Socialist Party
Independent Socialist Faction
Independent Socialist Party (Bolivia)
Independent Socialist Party (Bolivia, 1944)
Independent Socialist Party (Netherlands)
Independent Socialist Party (Romania)
Independent Socialist Republican Party